Mark James Hunter (born 25 July 1957) is a British Liberal Democrat politician and leader of Stockport Metropolitan Borough Council who became Member of Parliament (MP) for Cheadle at a 2005 by-election. At the 2015 general election, Hunter lost his seat to Mary Robinson of the Conservative Party. Since 19 May 2022, Hunter has served as the leader of Stockport Metropolitan Borough Council.

Education and background

Mark Hunter was educated at Audenshaw Grammar School for Boys and worked as a marketing executive for the Guardian Media Group until 2002.

Political career

Before Parliament

Mark Hunter ran as the Liberal candidate in Ashton under Lyne in the 1987 general election, and as the Liberal Democrat candidate in Stockport in the 2001 general election. He was first elected to Stockport Metropolitan Borough Council in May 1996 for a ward in Marple, and served as chair of education before replacing Patsy Calton as deputy leader and executive member for regeneration in June 2001 when she stood down after becoming the local MP. In May 2002 he became leader of the council.

As Leader, Mark Hunter served on the North West Regional Authority. He was also elected to the Liberal Democrat executive on the Local Government Association.

Election to Parliament

When Patsy Calton died from cancer shortly after the 2005 general election, Mark Hunter was selected to follow her. Stephen Day who was MP prior to 2001 was selected as the Conservative Party candidate.  In a by-election which saw accusations of 'dirty tricks' from all parties but was fairly low-profile (coming so soon after the general election), he managed to slightly increase the Liberal Democrat percentage of the vote on a lower turnout.

Parliamentary roles

Mark Hunter served as Liberal Democrat Deputy Chief Whip in the Coalition Government from 2010 until his resignation in 2014.
From the election of Nick Clegg as leader of the Liberal Democrats in December 2007 to the 2010 general election, Hunter served as Clegg's Parliamentary Private Secretary (PPS) and the party's Transport Spokesman in the Commons.

Prior to this, Hunter had been a member of the Shadow Foreign Affairs team in 2007, Shadow Home Affairs team in 2006 and Shadow ODPM team in 2005.

Hunter was a member of the Business, Enterprise and Regulatory Reform Committee which replaced the Trade and Industry Select Committee (of which he was also a member) in November 2007. By virtue of sitting on the BERR committee, Hunter was also a member of the Quadripartite Committee on Strategic Export Controls.

In 2009 he tabled an early day motion to save payments by cheque which were due to be phased out.

2015 general election

Mary Robinson defeated Mark Hunter with a majority of 6,453 on a 16.1% swing from the Liberal Democrats to the Conservatives. Hunter said that "sometimes you have to accept that you can't swim against the national tide."

2017 general election

Mark Hunter failed to regain his seat in the Cheadle constituency during the 2017 general election.

Return to Stockport Council
Hunter re-joined Stockport Metropolitan Borough Council after winning election to the Cheadle Hulme South ward in 2016. He subsequently replaced Iain Roberts as leader of the Liberal Democrat Group, and opposition leader, in June 2017.

Following the 2022 local elections he was elected as the leader of the council, ousting Labour's Elise Wilson.

References

External links
Mark Hunter MP official constituency site
Profile at the Liberal Democrats
Cheadle Liberal Democrats

UK MPs 2005–2010
UK MPs 2010–2015
Councillors in Stockport
1957 births
Living people
Liberal Democrats (UK) MPs for English constituencies
Members of the Parliament of the United Kingdom for Cheadle
Leaders of local authorities of England
Liberal Democrats (UK) councillors
Members of the Greater Manchester Combined Authority